Luke Hume (born 26 January 1988), nicknamed the "Bald Eagle", is an American former rugby union and rugby league footballer who plays for the USA Eagles and USA 7s rugby teams. He currently plays  Wing and Fullback for Rugby United New York (RUNY) in Major League Rugby (MLR).

Hume also played for French club RC Narbonne in the Pro D2 during the 2013–14 season. He formerly played rugby league with the USA Tomahawks.

Background
Hume was born in Sydney, Australia.

Rugby league
Originally from Sydney, Hume moved to New York City where he began playing rugby league for the New York Knights in the American National Rugby League. In 2009, his first year with the team, he led the Knights to a league championship and was awarded AMNRL MVP. Hume typically played . Hume scored a hat trick and earned man of the match honours in a 38–20 USA Tomahawks victory over the Ireland A side in the Donnybrook Cup. In September 2013, Hume was called up to the Tomahawks World Cup squad but had to withdraw after sustaining a broken leg.

Rugby union
Hume debuted for the Eagles in June 2012 in a loss to Canada during which he scored a try.

Hume played club rugby union for Old Blue in New York.

In rugby sevens, Hume debuted for the U.S. national team in 2012, and helped the USA qualify for the 2013 Rugby World Cup Sevens during the 2012 NACRA Sevens. Hume was signed to a contract by the U.S. national team for 2013.

In August 2013 Hume began playing for Gloucester A as part of a trial, scoring two tries in his first two matches for the A side team. Despite strong performances, Gloucester were unable to sign Hume for the 2013–14 season, but were keen on the possibility of Hume returning for the following season.

In January 2014 Hume signed a contract for RC Narbonne until the end of the season under the 'Medical Joker' rule making two appearances for the side. Hume left Narbonne at the end of his first season with the club, to pursue other opportunities in professional rugby.

See also
 United States national rugby sevens team

References

1988 births
Living people
American people of Australian descent
American rugby league players
American rugby union players
Dual-code rugby internationals
New York Knights players

People educated at Endeavour Sports High School
Rugby union players from Sydney
Rugby union wings
Rugby New York players
Sportsmen from New South Wales
United States international rugby sevens players
United States international rugby union players
United States national rugby league team players
RC Narbonne players